Transdev John Holland Buses is a bus operator in Sydney, Australia. A joint venture between Transdev and John Holland, it operates services in Sydney Bus Region 9 in the Eastern Suburbs under contract to Transport for NSW. It is a separate company to Transdev NSW, wholly owned by Transdev, which operates buses in other regions of Sydney.

History
In October 2019, the Government of New South Wales announced that the bus operations of State Transit were to be contracted out to the private sector. In November 2021, the contract was awarded to Transdev John Holland Buses (TJHB) with operations to commence on 3 April 2022.

Fleet
As of July 2022, the fleet consists of 488 buses operating out of three depots. 

Transdev John Holland Buses inherited a fleet of 474 buses from the STA, which included Volvo B10BLEs, Volvo B12BLEs, Mercedes-Benz O500LEs (both CNG and Euro 5), Volvo B12BLEAs, Scania K310UBs, Scania K280UBs, Volvo B8RLEs and Custom Denning Elements.

The current fleet is located below:

Depots
Transdev John Holland Buses operate out of three depots, these are:

 Port Botany (P)
 Randwick (R)
 Waverley (W)

See also
Transdev NSW - another Transdev bus operation in Sydney

References

Bus companies of New South Wales
Bus transport in Sydney
Transdev
Transport companies established in 2022
Australian companies established in 2022
Joint ventures